Diarmuid O'Donoghue was a Gaelic footballer from Killarney, County Kerry. He played with the Kerry senior team during the 1980s mainly in the National League when he won a medal in Kerry's 1984 as captain. He played 1 Championship game in 1984. He was part of the panel that won All Ireland titles in 1980, 1981 and 1984. He also played Junior with the county winning an All Ireland medal in 1983.

He played his club football with the Killarney Legion club.

His son James has played with Kerry at all levels winning Munster Championships at Minor and Senior level.

References
 http://www.terracetalk.com/kerry-football/player/177/Diarmuid-ODonoghue

Year of birth missing (living people)
Living people
Kerry inter-county Gaelic footballers
Killarney Legion Gaelic footballers